The following list is a discography of production by Symbolyc One (S1), an American hip hop record producer from Waco, Texas. It includes a list of songs produced, co-produced and remixed by year, artist, album and title.

2002

Strange Fruit Project – From Divine 
 01. "Intro"
 02. "Feel"
 03. "Stand Up"
 04. "A Place"
 05. "Ooh Wee
 06. "Waitin'"
 07. "Clap Yo Hands"
 08. "Aquatic Groove"
 09. "In the Garden"
 10. "Keep It Moving"
 11. "Tropical Rum"
 12. "Maintain" (Liquid Soul Mix)
 13. "Hypnotix"
 14. "The Night/Outro"
 16. "Form Divine"

2004

Strange Fruit Project – Soul Travelin''' ===
 01. "Intro"
 02. "Luv Is"
 03. "The Dotted Line"
 04. "Cloud Nine"
 05. "All the Way"
 06. "Move"
 07. "Honey"
 08. "Oh Yeah"
 10. "Recreate"
 11. "Soul Travelin'"
 12. "Oxygen"
 13. "Remember My Face"
 14. "Strange"
 15. "Speed Bump"
 16. "Gotta Lotta"
 17. "In the Sun"
 18. "Long Way"

== 2005 ==
=== Ghostface Killah & Trife da God ===
 "Milk Em" (Strange Fruit Project Version)

=== Symbolyc One (S1) & Illmind – The Art of Onemind ===
 01. "Art of Onemind (Intro)" (co-produced with Illmind)
 03. "Neva Gone Change" (featuring Supastition)
 05. "Hush" (featuring Deloach, Myone & Kay)
 07. "Blue Notes" (featuring Free Agents, Oneself & Myone)
 09. "Night Like This" (featuring Darien Brockington & Big Pooh)
 11. "The Groove" (featuring Organic Thoughts)
 14. "Onemind" (featuring El Da Sensei & Chip Fu)
 16. "Guilty Pleasures" (featuring Ken Starr and Thesis)

== 2006 ==
=== Strange Fruit Project – The Healing ===
 01. "Intro"
 02. "Ready Forum"
 04. "Under Pressure"
 05. "Good Times"
 12. "Cali Cruisin'" (featuring Deloach & Bavu)
 13. "Parachutes" (featuring Thesis)
 14. "God Is" (featuring Darien Brockington & Yahzarah)
 15. "After The Healing..." (featuring Verbal Seed, K-Otix, Tahiti, Skotch & Kay)

=== Darien Brockington – Somebody to Love ===
 11. "He Will Break Your Heart"

== 2007 ==
=== Strange Fruit Project – College Hoops 2K8 Video Game/Soundtrack ===
 "Underclassmen"
 "Through The Lane"

=== Yolanda Johnson – Meta Music Recordings Presents Soulsicle Vol. 1 ===
 01. "Intervention" (featuring T3)

== 2008 ==
=== Symbolyc One (S1) – The Music Box ===
 01. "Intro/Music Box" (featuring Speech)
 02. "Mash" (featuring Rapper Big Pooh & Kay)
 03. "Everybody Clap" (featuring Lifesavas & Tanya Morgan)
 04. "Neva" (featuring Tone Trezure)
 05. "Next Level" (featuring AEONZ)
 06. "Life Is a Movie"(featuring Rah Digga)
 07. "Chemistry"(featuring Yolanda Johnson)
 08. "Callin' Me" (featuring Phonte)
 09. "Know Your Name" (featuring Mojoe, The Ill, HeadKrack)
 10. "Who Stole the Music" (featuring Knessecary, Bavu Blakes, Glenn Reynolds)
 11. "Be Sure" (featuring DV Alias Khryst)
 12. "Jimmy Swag Art" (featuring Strange Fruit Project & Dawg Wonder)
 13. "Upper Echelon" (featuring Skyzoo, Supastition, Dow Jones)
 14. "Tire" (featuring Darien Brockington)

=== Tanya Morgan – Brooklynati ===
 17. "Tanya Likes Girls"

=== Spider Loc – Connected 4 ===
 07. "Betta Believe It" (featuring Kartoon & Mr. Fab)

=== Stacy Epps – The Awakening ===
 05. "Heaven" (featuring Bilal Salaam)

== 2009 ==
=== Juice – Position of Power ===
 06. "I Am Legend" (featuring Ya Boy)
 08. "Diamonds" (featuring Don Cannon)
 10. "It Is What It Is" (featuring The Counsel)

=== Juice ===
 "I Luv It"

=== Speech – The Grown Folks Table ===
 05. Start Spreading the News (featuring Chali 2na & Jahi)

=== Symbolyc One (S1) – Still Underrated Mixtape: Volume 1 ===
 06. "Supa Fly" (featuring Inspectah Deck & Blu)
 13. "I Get Money" (featuring Young Buck & Vohnbeatz)
 19. "Diamonds" (featuring Nipsey Hussle)

=== Strange Fruit Project – M.A.S.K. (Making Art Sound Kool) ===
 01. "M.A.S.K. Intro" (co-produced with Caleb)
 04. "Sepia Tone"
 05. "Day by Day" (featuring Supastition)
 06. "Fresh for Life" (co-produced with Caleb)
 07. "Sunrays (With Me)"
 08. "Why Does Summer Have to End" (co-produced with Caleb)

=== Supastition – Splitting Image ===
 04. "Splitting Image" (Neenah)

=== Symbolyc One (S1) & Braille – Cloud Nineteen ===
 01. "SkyDive"
 02. "It's Nineteen" (featuring Rob Swift)
 03. "For Life"
 04. "Broken Heart" (featuring Ragen Fykes, Strange Fruit Project & Thesis)
 05. "That's My Word" (featuring Theory Hazit & Rob Swift)
 06. "Fill It In" (featuring DJ Idull)
 07. "Skepticold"
 08. "Heart of God"
 09. "Found Her"
 10. "From The Pulpit"
 11. "Megaphone Phonics" (featuring Vursatyl)
 12. "Work That Way"
 13. "HardRock" (featuring Ohmega Watts, Othello & Lightheaded)
 14. "Stay Together" (featuring Ragen Fykes)
 15. "Parachutes & Ladders"
 16. "Frankenstein"

== 2010 ==
=== Kanye West – My Beautiful Dark Twisted Fantasy ===
 03. "Power" (co-produced with Kanye West)

=== Rhymefest – El Che ===
 03. "Say Wassup" (featuring Phonte) (co-produced with Caleb) 
 04. "How High" (featuring Little Brother & Darien Brockington) (co-produced with Caleb)
 05. "Chocolates"
 06. "One Hand Push Up"

=== Little Brother – Leftback ===
 09. "After the Party" (S1 & Caleb's Who Shot JR Ewing Remix) (featuring Carlitta Durand) (co-produced with Caleb)

=== Stat Quo – Statlanta ===
 10. "Alright" (co-produced with Caleb)

=== Yahzarah – The Ballad of Purple St. James ===
 01. "Strike Up the Band" (co-produced with Caleb)

=== Strange Fruit Project – A Dreamer's Journey ===
 01. "A Dreamer's Intro"
 02. "I'm Goin' Far" (featuring Pumah)
 03. "Heartbeat"
 04. "Bigger Than Me" (featuring Trey)
 05. "How Strange Is That"
 06. "1, 2"
 07. "Daydreamin'" (featuring Grey)
 08. "Gotta Move" (featuring Yolanda Johnson)
 09. "Big Time" (featuring Grey & Rhymefest)
 10. "Freedom" (featuring Verbal Seed & Tone Trezure)
 11. "Bright Lights"
 12. "Needy 2 U"
 13. "Seeing Is Believing"

=== Laws – 5:01 Overtime ===
 19. "So Nice" (featuring Jason Caesar) (co-produced by Caleb)

== 2011 ==
=== Beyoncé – 4 ===
 04. "Best Thing I Never Had" (produced with Babyface, Caleb, Antonio Dixon, Beyoncé, Shea Taylor)

=== Median – The Sender ===
 04. "Turn Ya On" (featuring Phonte and Big Remo)

=== Phonte – Charity Starts At Home ===
09. "Gonna Be A Beautiful Night" (featuring Carlitta Durand) (co-produced with Caleb)

=== Jay-Z & Kanye West – Watch the Throne ===
 10. "Murder to Excellence" (co-produced with Swizz Beatz)

=== Talib Kweli – Gutter Rainbows ===
 05. "Mr. International" (featuring Nigel Hall)
 07. "Wait for You" (featuring Kendra Ross)

=== Juice – American Me ===
 09. "Nothing In This World"

== 2012 ==
=== Lecrae – Church Clothes ===
 10. "The Price Of Life" (featuring Andy Mineo & Co Campbell)

=== Xzibit – Napalm ===
 08. "Stand Tall"  (featuring Slim the Mobster) (co-produced by M-Phazes)
 12. "Meaning of Life"

=== Various Artists – The Man with the Iron Fists (soundtrack) ===
 11. "Tick, Tock"  (featuring Pusha T, Raekwon, Joell Ortiz & Danny Brown) (produced with Frank Dukes)

=== The Game – Jesus Piece ===
 15. "Blood Diamonds" (Deluxe Edition track)

=== 50 Cent – Street King Immortal ===
 00. "My Life" (featuring Eminem & Adam Levine)

== 2013 ==
=== Talib Kweli – Prisoner of Conscious ===
 08. Push Thru (featuring Curren$y, Kendrick Lamar & Glen Reynolds)
 10. Delicate Flowers (co-produced by Caleb McCampbell)

=== Kanye West – Yeezus ===
 09. Guilt Trip (co-produced by Arca, Travis Scott, Mike Dean & Ackeejuice Rockers)

=== Stalley – Honest Cowboy ===
 10. "Gettin' By"

=== Sivion – Group Therapy ===
 05. "The Best" (featuring DJ Manwell)

=== Eminem – The Marshall Mathers LP 2 ===
 01. "Bad Guy"

== 2014 ==
=== Roc C & Rapper Big Pooh – Trouble In the Neighborhood ===
 01. "Set It Off"
 06. "Handle It"

=== Logic – Under Pressure ===
 06. "Bounce"
 12. "Till the End"

== 2015 ==
=== Lupe Fiasco – Tetsuo & Youth ===
 03. "Blur My Hands" (featuring Guy Sebastian) (co-produced by M-Phazes)
 07. "Body Of Work" (featuring Troi & Terrace Martin) (co-produced by Vohn Beatz)
 08. "Little Death" (featuring Nikki Jean) (co-produced by Vohn Beatz)

=== The Game – The Documentary 2 ===
 08. "Last Time You Seen" (featuring Scarface & Stacy Barthe)

=== Gladys Knight – TBD ===
 "Just a Little" (co-produced by Avehre)

== 2016 ==
=== Lecrae – Church Clothes 3 ===
 Executive producer
 01. "Freedom" (featuring N'Dambi) (co-produced by Epikh Pro and VohnBeatz)
 02. "Gangland" (featuring Propaganda) (co-produced by Shindo)
 03. "Deja Vu"
 05. "Cruising" (co-produced by Epikh Pro)
 06. "It Is What It Is" (co-produced by Epikh Pro)
 08. "Forever"
 09. "Misconceptions 3" (featuring John Givez, JGivens and Jackie Hill-Perry)

=== Royce da 5'9" – Layers ===
 01. "Tabernacle" (co-produced by J. Rhodes)
 13. "America" (co-produced by Epikh)
 16. "Gottaknow" (co-produced by Epikh)

== 2017 ==
=== Drake – More Life ===
21. "Ice Melts" (featuring Young Thug) (produced with Supah Mario)

=== Lorde – Melodrama ===
 07. "Sober II (Melodrama)" (additional production)

=== Phora – Yours Truly Forever ===
03. "Facts" (produced with Eskupe & Anthro Beats)

=== Lil Uzi Vert – Luv Is Rage 2 ===
 19. "Loaded" (produced with TM88)

== 2018 ==
===Royce da 5'9" - Book of Ryan===
4. "Caterpillar" (featuring Eminem, Logic and King Green) (produced with Epikh Pro)
6. "Dumb" (featuring Boogie) (produced with Epikh Pro)
13. "Amazing" (featuring Melanie Rutherford) (produced with Epikh Pro)

=== Lil Xan – Total Xanarchy ===
6. "Saved by the Bell" <small> (produced with Lonestarrmuzik, Oshi & Krs. )

=== Eminem – Kamikaze ===
5. "Normal" (produced with Swish Allnet, Illa da Producer & Lonestarrmuzik)
11. "Nice Guy" (featuring Jessie Reyez) (produced with Fred Ball & Eminem)

=== Lupe Fiasco – Drogas Wave'' 
4. "Gold vs. the Right Things to Do" (produced with Luis Manuel & Lupe Fiasco)

References 

Hip hop discographies
Production discographies
Discographies of American artists